There have been two baronetcies created for persons with the surname Fetherston, one in the Baronetage of England and one in the Baronetage of Ireland. Both are extinct.

The Fetherston Baronetcy of Blakesware, Hertfordshire was created in the Baronetage of England for Heneage Fetherston on 4 Dec 1660.

The Fetherston Baronetcy of Ardagh, County Longford was created in the Baronetage of Ireland for Ralph Fetherston on 4 August 1776.

Fetherston baronets, of Blakesware, Hertfordshire (1660)

 Sir Heneage Fetherston, 1st Baronet ( – 23 October 1711)
 Sir Henry Fetherston, 2nd Baronet (c. 1654 – 17 October 1746) 	Baronetcy extinct on his death

Fetherston baronets, of Ardagh, County Longford (1776)

 Sir Ralph Fetherston, 1st Baronet (born by 1731 – 3 June 1780)
 Sir Thomas Fetherston, 2nd Baronet (1759 – 19 July 1819)	MP for Longford 1801–1819
 Sir George Fetherston, 3rd Baronet (4 June 1784 – 12 July 1853) MP for Longford 1819–1830
 Sir Thomas Francis Fetherston, 4th Baronet (1800 – 28 August 1853)
 Sir Thomas John Fetherston, 5th Baronet (22 July 1824 – 21 September 1869)
 Sir George Ralph Fetherston, 6th Baronet (8 April 1852 – 11 February 1923) Baronetcy extinct on his death. He was survived by his sister Adeline Margaret.

See also
Fetherstonhaugh baronets

References

Extinct baronetcies in the Baronetage of England
Extinct baronetcies in the Baronetage of Ireland